Basudih is a village in Nala block, Jamtara district, Jharkhand state, India has a Population (2001 Census) of 500 in about 50 families.

Geography

Location

Overview
The map shows a large area, which is a plateau with low hills, except in the eastern portion where the Rajmahal hills intrude into this area and the Ramgarh hills are there. The south-western portion is just a rolling upland. The entire area is overwhelmingly rural with only small pockets of urbanisation.

Note: The full screen map is interesting. All places marked on the map are linked in the full screen map and one can easily move on to another page of his/her choice. Enlarge the full screen map to see what else is there – one gets railway connections, many more road connections and so on.

Demographics
 India census, Basudih had a population of 500. Males constitute 51% of the population and females 49%. Basudih has an average literacy rate of 71%, higher than the national average of 59.5%, male literacy is 78%, and female literacy is 62%. In Basudih, 12% of the population is under 6 years of age.

Climate
Basudih has a humid subtropical climate (Köppen climate classification Cwa), with warm, wet summers and mild winters.

Gallery

References

External links
 Primary School Basudih

See also

 Sarak
 Maji (surname)

Cities and towns in Jamtara district